Valeriy Kartavtsev is a Ukrainian jurist and politician. In 1993 - 1994 he served as a secretary of the Council of National Security of Ukraine. In 2003 - 2004 Kartavtsev was acting rector in the academy of the Security Service of Ukraine.

References

External links
 Ukraine official. Council of National Security and Defense of Ukraine. Ukrinform. 21 December 2000
 Historical background about the Council of National Security and Defense of Ukraine. Council of National Security and Defense of Ukraine

1949 births
Living people
People from Sumy Oblast
Yaroslav Mudryi National Law University alumni
Ukrainian jurists
Secretaries of National Security and Defense Council of Ukraine